John Wooleston Tibbatts (June 12, 1802 – July 5, 1852) was a nineteenth-century politician and lawyer from Kentucky.

Born in Lexington, Kentucky, Tibbatts pursued classical studies, studied law and was admitted to the bar in 1826, commencing practice in Newport, Kentucky. He held several local offices before being elected a Democrat to the United States House of Representatives in 1842, serving from 1843 to 1847.  He unsuccessfully proposed in February 1846 a boundary settlement with Mexico along the Sierra Madre Mountains. When war came he supported the Polk administration's war policy.

Tibbatts served as a colonel of the 16th Infantry Regiment in the Mexican–American War and afterwards resumed practicing law in Newport, Kentucky. He died in Newport on July 5, 1852, and was interred there in Evergreen Cemetery.

External links

 

1802 births
1852 deaths
Kentucky lawyers
United States Army officers
American military personnel of the Mexican–American War
Politicians from Lexington, Kentucky
People from Newport, Kentucky
Democratic Party members of the United States House of Representatives from Kentucky
19th-century American politicians
19th-century American lawyers